John Garner may refer to:

John Nance Garner (1868–1967), Vice President of the United States (1933–1941)
John Garner (golfer) (born 1947), English golfer
John Donald Garner (born 1931), British diplomat
John T. Garner (1809–1888), soldier in the Texas Army during the Texas Revolution